Ivan Hoste (born 8 December 1952) is a Belgian footballer. He played in one match for the Belgium national football team in 1982.

References

External links
 

1952 births
Living people
Belgian footballers
Belgium international footballers
Place of birth missing (living people)
People from Tongeren
Association footballers not categorized by position
Footballers from Limburg (Belgium)